The year 1990 in radio involved some significant events.


Events
KJJO in Minneapolis, Minnesota transitions from active rock to alternative rock.
KBLN in Dallas, Texas becomes KXEB.
Daytimer KKDA in Dallas, Texas begins nighttime broadcasting.
Emmis Communications sells several of their most noteworthy stations to offset losses from the purchase of the Seattle Mariners, including KXXX in San Francisco, WAVA-FM in Washington, DC and WLOL in Minneapolis, Minnesota.
WHTE-FM signs in as Adult Contemporary format in the Charlottesville, Virginia Area.
March 13 – WLVK/Charlotte flips to "high octane country" as "Thunder 96.9"; this direction last only a few months, with the station shifting back to a more traditional country format.
June – KNRJ/Houston flips from Rhythmic CHR to Alternative Rock. The Alternative format will last only 5 weeks, and is promoted as temporary while the station's owners, Nationwide Communications, begin researching the market for a new format.
July 13 – Nationwide Communications sells off WGAR 1220-AM in Cleveland, which was a direct simulcast of country WGAR 99.5-FM, to Douglas Broadcasting. WGAR-AM signs off at midnight on July 13 after airing a brief retrospective on the station, highlighted with tributes from station alumni Jack Paar and Don Imus. The station relaunches as WKNR a few minutes later, carrying a satellite-delivered oldies format, but will gradually assume an all-sports lineup in less than a year.
July 20 – Nationwide's KNRJ flips to Hot AC as KHMX, "Mix 96.5."
August 22 – Echo of Moscow, a 24/7 independent commercial station, begins broadcasting from Moscow.
October 2 – Radio Berlin International ceased its operation. The following day, Germany reunified.

Debuts
 Chippie, a radio program on computer topics, debuts on Hessischer Rundfunk in Frankfurt.

Deaths
July 7 – Bill Cullen, American radio personality, game show host (born 1920)
July 8 – Evelyn Kaye, American violinist, "Evelyn and Her Magic Violin" on The Hour of Charm
July 30 – Karl Weber, American actor in old-time radio (born 1916)
October 26 – William S. Paley, American chief executive who built Columbia Broadcasting System (CBS) from a small radio network into one of the foremost radio and television network operations in the United States (born 1901)

See also
Radio broadcasting

References

 
Radio by year